Khaveh (also Romanized as Khāveh and Khāweh) is a village in Behnamarab-e Jonubi Rural District, Javadabad District, Varamin County, Tehran Province, Iran. At the 2006 census, its population was 1,088, in 279 families.

References 

Populated places in Varamin County